Allan Noel Minns, DSO, MC, (23 March 1891 – 6 April 1921) was an English medical doctor of African-Caribbean descent who served as an officer in the British Army during the First World War.

He was born in Thetford, Norfolk in 1891, the son of the Bahamian Allan Glaisyer Minns and Emily . His father was a doctor and later mayor of Thetford, the first black man to be the mayor of an English town.  Educated at Thetford Grammar School, Allan junior followed his father by attending Guy's Hospital, qualifying as a doctor in 1914. 

After volunteering for the Royal Army Medical Corps he was commissioned as a lieutenant in September 1914, rising to the rank of captain in March 1918. He saw active service in Gallipoli and Mesopotamia. He was awarded two medals for bravery – the Military Cross in 1915 for gallantry at Suvla Bay on 30 August, and the Distinguished Service Order in December 1916. He was twice mentioned in despatches.

He died in hospital on 6 April 1921 aged 30, following a motor accident, and is buried in Thetford Cemetery.

References

1891 births
1921 deaths
British Army personnel of World War I
Royal Army Medical Corps officers
People from Thetford
People educated at Thetford Grammar School
20th-century English medical doctors
English people of Bahamian descent
Recipients of the Military Cross
Companions of the Distinguished Service Order
Road incident deaths in England